Come into My Life may refer to:

 Come into My Life (Joyce Sims album), 1987 including title track
 Come into My Life (Gala album), 1997
 "Come into My Life" (Gala song), 1997
 Come into My Life (Jermaine Jackson album), 1973
 "Come into My Life" (Laura Branigan and Joe Esposito song), 1988